OAO Kuban Airlines was an airline based in Krasnodar, Russia. It operated domestic flights within Russia, as well as international charters. Its main base was Krasnodar International Airport. Its name comes from Kuban Province in southern Russia. On 11 December 2012 Kuban Airlines ceased operations due to financial difficulties.

History 

Kuban Airlines was founded as a division of Aeroflot in 1932. It became an independent company in 1992, owned by the state (51%) and the airline employees (49%).

In February 2010, Kuban Airlines introduced a new livery to its first Boeing 737-300 aircraft. The new livery was a dark green background with sunflowers running from the back half of the fuselage and up the tail. The engines were also coloured in dark green.

On 18 May 2010, Kuban Airlines announced the receipt of their first of four ordered Boeing 737-300s. The airline also announced that beginning in 2011 their Yakolev aircraft were to be retired and replaced by new Antonov An-148 or Boeing 737-700 aircraft.

Merger with Sky Express
In September 2011, it was announced that Russian low-cost carrier Sky Express was to be merged into Kuban Airlines. On 29 October 2011, the two airlines merged, bringing Airbus A319 and Boeing 737 aircraft into the Kuban Airlines fleet.

Destinations

Fleet 

The Kuban Airlines fleet consisted of the following aircraft in November 2012:

Previously operated 
Prior to November 2012, the airline has also operated:

 Antonov An-24
 Tupolev Tu-154M
 Yakovlev Yak-42 – Retired on 1 November 2012

See also

 Babyflot

References

External links 

Kuban Airlines
Kuban Airlines (Archive) 

Airlines established in 1992
Airlines disestablished in 2012
Former Aeroflot divisions
Defunct airlines of Russia
Companies based in Krasnodar